Blase may refer to:
Saint Blase or Saint Blaise (4th century), patron saint of wool combers 
Blase J. Cupich (born 1949), archbishop of the Chicago Archdiocese
Blase Bonpane (fl. 1983–2018), director of the Office of the Americas
Tom Golisano or Blase Thomas Golisano (born 1941), American businessman and philanthropist
Francis Blase Delehanty (1859–1932), justice of the New York Supreme Court
Dave Blase (fl. 1958–1962), American cyclist
Blase, Missouri, unincorporated community in St. Charles County, Missouri, U.S.

See also 
Blasé (disambiguation)
Bläse, a settlement in Fleringe on the island of Gotland, Sweden